The Dioxin affair was a political crisis that struck in Belgium during the spring of 1999.
Contamination of feedstock with polychlorinated biphenyls (PCB) was detected in animal food products, mainly eggs and chickens.
Although health inspectors reported the problem in January, measurements were taken only from May 1999 when the media revealed the case. The then Flemish Liberals and Democrats (VLD) opposition leader Guy Verhofstadt claimed that the government was trying to cover up the so-called "nota Destickere", which proved that several secretaries of state were informed much earlier that the food contained PCBs and dioxins.

Political scandal 

The Dioxin Affair started with some complaints from chicken farmers who noticed increased death among newborn chickens. Laboratory analysis confirmed the presence of dioxin-like toxins well above normal limits in the eggs, tissues and feed of the affected birds. It was later confirmed that the dioxin-like toxicity was a result of the presence of PCBs, many of which form part of the group of dioxins and dioxin-like compounds which have toxic properties, in the birds’ feed.  

Later investigations revealed that the source of the contamination came from an oil-and-fat-recycling company, Verkest, from Deinze. The fats were reprocessed into animal feed that also contained transformer oil (coolant fluid), a known source of PCBs.

Public concern about the quality of animal food in general became a hot issue in the media. This forced the commission to ban certain recycling streams (like frying oil) from entering the food chain in order to prevent future contamination. Later studies indicated that there was never a serious danger to human health because the contaminated material was largely diluted during the production of the animal feed. Seven million chickens and fifty thousand pigs were slaughtered and discarded.

Many farms were closed down for months and animal food products were banned from the market. During the investigation, questions were raised as to whether the costs for destroying the food and feedstock were necessary, as it seemed obvious that the contaminated food had already passed through the food market during the period from January to May. To protect the farmers, the Belgian government promised to compensate them for their losses.  The crisis also damaged the export of Belgian animal products. Many Belgians went shopping for meat and dairy products in foreign countries. The total costs of the food crisis are estimated at 25 billion francs, or 625 million Euros.

Political implications 
The dioxin crisis strongly influenced the federal elections of 1999 (as well as the regional elections of 1999). The governing party, Christian People's Party (CVP), suffered a historic loss and forced the end of premier Jean-Luc Dehaene's eight-year reign. This meant a victory for the VLD and Guy Verhofstadt, who had brought the affair to public attention in the first place, resulting in him becoming Prime Minister of Belgium until 2007. Green parties Ecolo and Agalev were also able to profit from the public concern around environment and food quality.

Health implications 
In 2001, a public report announced that high dioxin levels were detected in Belgians' blood plasma compared to other European populations. A direct link to the dioxin crisis seemed obvious. Later comparison with blood samples that were taken before the crisis disproved this hypothesis. High levels could also be attributed to the dense populations and industry.

See also
Dioxin controversy
Federal Agency for the Safety of the Food Chain

References

External links 
 Review on Belgium dioxin crisis of 1999

Government crises
Political scandals in Belgium
20th-century scandals
Environment of Belgium
Dioxins
1999 in Belgium
1999 in the environment
1999 health disasters